Herbert Feurer (born 14 January 1954) is a retired football goalkeeper from Austria.

Career
Born in Aspang, Feurer played professional football with 1. Wiener Neustädter SC and Rapid Wien. Feuer played 13 seasons with Rapid, winning the league (1981-82, 1982-83, 1986-87 and 1987-88) and cup four times with the club. He helped Rapid reach the final of the 1984–85 European Cup Winners' Cup. Feurer was voted Austria's football player of the year in 1980 and 1981.

He also appeared seven times for the Austria national team, featuring in the 1982 FIFA World Cup squad in Spain.

References

External links
 
 

1954 births
Living people
Austrian footballers
Austria international footballers
Association football goalkeepers
1982 FIFA World Cup players
Austrian Football Bundesliga players
SK Rapid Wien players
1. Wiener Neustädter SC players
People from Neunkirchen District, Austria
Footballers from Lower Austria